Dromolaxia–Meneou ( is a municipality of Larnaca District. It consists of two quarters, Dromolaxia and Meneou. It was founded at 2011 after a referendum.

References

 
Municipalities in Larnaca District